The Kasturba Gandhi National Memorial Trust is an organisation dedicated to the development of women and children in rural India. It was founded by Mahatma Gandhi in 1945 in dedication to his deceased wife Kasturba Gandhi. It has its headquarters in Kasturbagram, Indore, Madhya Pradesh. It has branches in 22 States and focuses on health care, education, vocational training and employment.
In 2008, the Government of India conferred the Indira Gandhi Award for National Integration upon the trust.

Chairpersons 
List of chairpersons of the Trust:
1944–1948 Mahatma Gandhi
1948–1950 Vallabhbhai Patel
1951–1951 Thakkar Bapa
1951–1956 Ganesh Vasudev Mavalankar
1956–1972 Premlila Vithaldas Thackersey
1972–1985 Lakshmi N. Menon
1985–1988 Maniben Patel
1988–2001 Sushila Nayyar
2001–2013 Dhirubhai Mehta

See also
Shakuntala Choudhary

References 

Development charities based in India
National trusts
Women in India